The House at 1648 Riverside Drive, also known as the Graber Residence and as 1648 Viets Avenue, was a  property consisting of two buildings in Grand Forks, North Dakota, that was listed on the National Register of Historic Places in 1994.

It included Queen Anne style architecture.

The house was lost in the 1997 Red River flood.

References

Houses on the National Register of Historic Places in North Dakota
Houses in Grand Forks, North Dakota
Houses completed in 1883
National Register of Historic Places in Grand Forks, North Dakota
Queen Anne architecture in North Dakota
1883 establishments in Dakota Territory
1997 disestablishments in North Dakota
Buildings and structures destroyed by flooding
1997 Red River flood